Abuja Investments Company Limited (AICL) is a leading business development and investment holding company for the Federal Capital Territory Administration (FCTA), based in the Capital City - Abuja, Nigeria.

History
AICL was incorporated in 1994 as Abuja Investment and Property Development Company (AIPDC). The firm has since undergone a number of restructuring processes and currently functions as an interface between the government and investors interested in operating within the Federal Capital Territory. AICL was created and is wholly owned by the Federal Capital Territory Administration (FCTA) with the vision to build capacity in public private partnership administration and asset management for sustained development. AICL was conceived to be a publicly owned yet privately funded Limited Liability Company to act as the FCT's Holding Company. With over $100M currently under management AICL has grown to become a world class investment firm with a diversified portfolio to include investments in Transportation, Technology, Real Estate, etc.

Holdings
The following are subsidiaries and business affiliates under AICL:

Subsidiaries
  Abuja Property Development Company Limited (APDC)	100%
  Abuja Urban Mass Transport Company Limited (AUMTCO)] 	        100%
  Abuja Market Management Limited (AMML) 		 95%
  Abuja Technology Village Free Zone (ATVFZ) 		 51%
  Abuja Film Village Ltd 				 50%
 Gas Farm Project 					 50%

Affiliates
 Abuja Leasing Company (ALC) 				 20%
 PowerNoth AICL Equipment Leasing Company		 20%
 American Hospital 					 20%
 ASO Savings & Loans Plc				 10%
 Abuja Power Company Ltd 				 10%
 Capital Hotels (Sheraton Hotels and Towers Abuja])	 6.51%
 Abuja Downtown Mall 					 5%

Business Services
AICL in its capacity as a quasi-government organisation has since been in the business of structuring public-private partnerships. In this vein the company offers the following services:
Business Development
Financial Advisory
Investment Management
Project Management
Real Estate Development
Venture Capital

Sector Growth

Banking & Finance 
AICL helped structure Aso Savings & Loans Plc the foremost Mortgage Banking institution in the Capital City.

Commerce 
AICL's subsidiary Abuja Markets Management Limited (AMML) provides facility management services to almost all markets in the capital, Abuja.

Energy 
The company has structured various platform companies for the economic development of the FCT in the energy sector, a couple of such companies are:
 Gas Farm Project
 Abuja Power Company

Entertainment & Hospitality 
AICL has strategic holdings in Capital Hotels (Sheraton Hotel & Towers, Abuja) and is parent company to Abuja Film Village

Environment 
In partnership with the Abuja Environmental Protection Agency (AEPB), AICL has made huge investments in this sector especially in the provision of waste disposal trucks through the incorporation of PowerNoth AICL Equipment Leasing Company for the clearance of waste from the city center.

Health 
AICL is working on incorporating the American Hospital, a project that has been underway since 2009.

Real Estate & Infrastructure 
AICL holds investments in:
 Abuja Property Development Company Limited (APDC)
 Abuja Downtown Mall

Technology 
In line with the Federal Capital Territory Master Plan, AICL set up the following companies to create increased capacity in the technology sector and improve existing automotive services in the region:
 Abuja Technology Village Free Zone
 Abuja Automotive Village

Transportation 
AICL has contributed immensely to the transportation sector of the economy through the establishment of two key subsidiary companies: Abuja Leasing Company (ALC) and Abuja Urban Mass Transport Company (AUMTCO).

ALC provides a platform for individuals and companies to purchase vehicles for taxi services under a PPP structured arrangement tagged 'Abuja Green Cab Scheme'. This scheme provides lease finance to qualifying Nigerians over a tenure of up to four years for the purchase of Cabs.

AUMTCO provides subsidized transportation services to all inhabitants in the Federal Capital Territory (FCT). The company has over 150 buses which ply designated routes in the capital city and provides adhoc transportation services to satellite towns which provide most of the workforce to the Capital City.

Partners
Over the years Abuja Investments Company Limited has been noted to work with the following companies:
Abuja Environmental Protection Board
African University of Science & Technology
Aso Savings & Loans Plc
Churchgate Group
Craft Technologies Limited
Kakara Rapid Development

References

External links 
 Official Company website
 Official site of Nigeria's Federal Capital Territory (FCT) and City of Abuja
 Nigerian Investment Promotion Council

Investment companies of Nigeria
Holding companies established in 1994
Economy of Abuja
Nigerian companies established in 1994